Swanbank is an industrial locality in the City of Ipswich, Queensland, Australia. In the  Swanbank had a population of 0 people.

Geography 
The predominant land usage in Swanbank is industrial, including the Swanbank Power Station. There are both current and historic mines in the area. The south-west of the locality is used for grazing on native vegetation.

The Swanbank railway line  enters the locality from the north (Blackstone) and terminates in two balloon loops. There are two railway stations:

 Swanbank railway station
 Box Flat railway station

History 
Early settler James Foote named the locality after his wife's birthplace Swanbank in Lanarkshire, Scotland. Previous names for this area were Logan Lagoon and Josey's Lagoon.

On 31 July 1972, the Box Flat Mine experienced an explosion which took the lives of 18 men and led to the closure of the mine.

In the  Swanbank had a population of 0 people.

Heritage 
Swanbank railway station is used by a heritage and railway preservation society. The heritage train trips are operated by Queensland Pioneer Steam Railway who have steam train rides around Swanbank rail loop which was used to service the coal needs of Swanbank power station.

References

External links

 
 Queensland pioneer steam railway

City of Ipswich
Localities in Queensland